Bernardino Fernández de Velasco, 6th Duke of Frias, Grandee of Spain, (8 February  1609 – 31 March 1652), was a Spanish nobleman  and diplomat.

Biography
Bernardino Fernández de Velasco was the oldest son of Juan Fernández de Velasco and of María Angela de Aragón y Guzmán. He inherited the title of Constable of Castile and like his father, Bernardino was Governor of the Duchy of Milan between 1647 and 1648. He was also Viceroy of Aragon between 1645 and 1647. King John IV of Portugal was his nephew.

Descendants
In 1629, the Duke married Isabel María de Guzmán, with whom he had four children. He married for a second time with María Enríquez Sarmiento de Mendoza, but they had no issue.

By Isabel María de Guzmán:
Íñigo Melchor de Velasco, 7th Duke of Frías
Juana de Velasco y Tovar, was married three times, with: 
Enrique Felípez de Guzmán, 1st Marquis of Mayrena, 2nd Duque of Sanlúcar de Barrameda 
Alonso Melchor Téllez-Girón y Pacheco
Juan Enríquez de Borja, 7th Marquis of Alcañices
Francisco de Velasco, 5th Marquis of Berlanga
Andrea de Velasco, was married twice, with: 
Manuel Enríquez de Almansa, 10th Count of Alba de Liste 
Lorenzo de Cárdenas, 13th Count of la Puebla del Maestre

He had at least one illegitimate son : 
 Francisco Fernández de Velasco y Tovar, marquis of Carvajal (Madrid, Spain,  1646–1716), military Governor of Ceuta and Cádiz, as well as fighting in Portugal and in Flanders, and in 1697 in Catalunya against the French troops commanded by Louis Joseph de Bourbon, Duke of Vendôme (1654 – 11 June 1712), acting later in  Barcelona during the War of the Spanish Succession, 1701–1714,  against the Catalan groups supporting the Austrian pretender to the vacant Spanish Crown, later Charles VI, Holy Roman Emperor (1685–1740).

Works

Notes

Sources

 

1609 births
1652 deaths
Viceroys of Aragon
Governors of the Duchy of Milan
106
Marquesses of Berlanga
108
Counts of Castilnovo
Knights of Santiago
Bernardino
Bernardino 06
Spanish diplomats
Grandees of Spain